This is a list of films released by India's Bollywood Hindi language film industry in 1980.

Top-grossing films 
The top ten grossing films at the Indian Box Office in
1980:

Films

References 

1980
Bollywood
Films, Bollywoo
d